was the pen name of  (1829–1894), a Japanese author and journalist.

Career
Kanagaki Robun, the son of a fishmonger, was originally known for light fiction in the gesaku genre. He is said to have met painter Kawanabe Kyosai while writing an account of the 1855 Edo earthquake on the day after it happened. Kyosai's sketch of a catfish, accompanying Robun's text, was Kyosai's first single-sheet ukiyo-e woodblock print. Its commercial success saw Robun producing a sequence of catfish pictures (known as namazu-e). In 1874 the pair collaborated to create what was effectively Japan's first manga magazine, Eshinbun nipponchi (Illustrated News).

In 1874 Robun turned to journalism, joining the Yokohama mainichi shinbun and going on in 1875 to found his own newspaper, the Kana-yomi shinbun (Kana Newspaper). His newspaper pioneered the genre of "dokufu-mono," criminal biographies of female outlaws, and Kanagaki Robun's own Tale of Takahashi Oden the She-Devil (written rapidly after Takahashi Oden was beheaded for killing a man) is the most famous example of the genre.

He also wrote illustrated biographies, including an adapted biography of Ulysses S. Grant published for Grant's 1879 visit to Japan.

Works
  (1856)
  (1856)
  (1870–76), a parody of Jippensha Ikku's Tōkaidōchū Hizakurige
  (1871)
  (1872)
  (1872)
  (1874)
  (1879)
  (1886)

References

1829 births
1894 deaths
Japanese journalists
Japanese writers
19th-century Japanese novelists